The Comunidade Intermunicipal do Alentejo Litoral (English: Littoral Alentejo) is an administrative division in Portugal. It was created in May 2009. It is also a NUTS3 subregion of the Alentejo Region. The seat of the intermunicipal community is Grândola. Alentejo Litoral comprises municipalities of both the Beja District and the Setúbal District. The population in 2011 was 97,925, in an area of 5,309.41 km2.

Municipalities
It is composed of five municipalities:

References

External links

Official website CIM Alentejo Litoral

Alentejo
Intermunicipal communities of Portugal